Thermidarctia thermidoides is a moth in the subfamily Arctiinae. It was described by George Talbot in 1929. It is found in Venezuela.

References

Moths described in 1929
Arctiinae